Ismilli (also, Ismailli and Ismeilli) is a village in the Neftchala Rayon of Azerbaijan.

References 

Populated places in Neftchala District